Portloman is a civil parish in County Westmeath, Ireland.

Portloman is one of 8 civil parishes in the barony of Corkaree in the Province of Leinster.

Portloman civil parish comprises 8 townlands: Ballard, Ballyboy, Balrath, Grangegeeth, Monroe, Portloman, Scurlockstown and Wattstown.

The neighbouring civil parishes are: Portnashangan to the north, Rathconnell (barony of Moyashel and Magheradernon) to the east, Templeoran (barony of Moygoish) to the south and west.

References

External links
Portloman civil parish at the IreAtlas Townland Data Base
Portloman civil parish at Townlands.ie
Portloman civil parish at Logainm.ie

Civil parishes of County Westmeath